Ağabəyli (also, Ağabeyli, Agabeyli, and Agalarbeyli) is a village and municipality in the Agsu Rayon of Azerbaijan.  It has a population of 528.

References 

Populated places in Agsu District